This article is about the particular significance of the decade 1800–1809 to Wales and its people.

Events
1800
1801
1802
1803
1804
1805
1806
1807
1808
1809

Arts and literature

New books
J. T. Barber - A Tour Throughout South Wales and Monmouthshire (1803)
Thomas Charles - The Welsh Methodists Vindicated (1802)
Edward Davies
Celtic Researches on the Origin, Traditions and Languages of the Ancient Britons (1804)
The Mythology and Rites of the British Druids (1809)
Robert Davies (Bardd Nantglyn)
Barddoniaeth (1803)
Ieithiadur neu Ramadeg Cymraeg (1808)
Thomas Edwards (Twm o'r Nant) - Bannau y Byd (1808)
John Evans - A Tour through part of North Wales in ... 1798 and at other times (1800)
John Jones - A Development of ... Events calculated to restore the Christian Religion to its ... Purity (1800)
Thomas Jones - A Cardiganshire Landlord's Advice to his Tenants (1800)
Richard Llwyd - Beaumaris Bay (1800)
The Myvyrian Archaiology of Wales, vol. 1 (1801)
William Ouseley - Epitome of the Ancient History of Persia (1800)
William Owen Pughe - Geiriadur Cymraeg-Saesneg (1803)
Abraham Rees - The New Cyclopaedia, vol. 1 (1802)
Thomas Roberts of Llwynrhudol - Amddiffyniad i'r Methodistiaid (1806)
Azariah Shadrach - Allwedd Myfyrdod (1801)
Charles Symmons - Life of Milton (1806)
Richard Warner - Second Walk Through Wales (1800)
Henry Wigstead - Remarks on a Tour to North and South Wales: In the Year 1797 (1800)

Music
1802
Edward Jones (Bardd y Brenin) - The Musical and Poetical Relicks of the Welsh Bards, vol. 2
1806
Casgliad o Hymnau gan mwyaf heb erioed eu hargraffu o'r blaen (collection of hymns)
1807
Anthem y Saint... gan Evan Dafydd (collection of hymns)

Sport
1802 - Royal Anglesey Yacht Club founded at Beaumaris.

Births
1800
6 March - Samuel Roberts (S.R.), Radical leader (d. 1885)
20 June - Edward Douglas-Pennant, 1st Baron Penrhyn (d. 1886)
1 October - Williams Evans, hymnist (d. 1880)
29 November - David Griffith (Clwydfardd), poet and archdruid (d. 1894)
date unknown - James James (Iago Emlyn), minister and poet (d. 1879)
1801
6 February - William Williams (Caledfryn), poet and critic (d. 1869)
18 November - David Rees, minister and writer (d. 1869)
1802
August - Ebenezer Thomas, poet (d. 1863)
24 August - William Rowlands (Gwilym Lleyn) (d. 1865)
8 November
Benjamin Hall, 1st Baron Llanover (d. 1867)
William Rees (Gwilym Hiraethog), poet and author (d. 1883)
4 December - Calvert Jones, pioneer photographer (d. 1877)
12 December
John Ryland Harris, printer (d. 1823)
Isaac Williams, poet (d. 1865)
date unknown - Thomas Robert Jones, founder of the True Ivorites (d. 1856)
1803
10 May - Christopher Rice Mansel Talbot, owner of Margam Castle (d. 1890)
17 October - Samuel Holland, industrialist (d. 1892)
date unknown - Owain Meirion, balladeer (d. 1868)
1806
1 February - Jane Williams (Ysgafell), writer (d. 1885)
21 April - Sir George Cornewall Lewis, statesman (d. 1863)
1807
date unknown - Sir William Milbourne James (judge) (d. 1881)
1808
date unknown - Sir John Henry Scourfield, author (d. 1876)
1809
18 January - John Gwyn Jeffreys, conchologist (d. 1885)
17 April - Thomas Brigstocke, painter (d. 1881)
24 May - William Chambers, politician (d. 1882)
26 May - G. T. Clark, engineer (d. 1885)
11 August - Robert Thomas (Ap Vychan), writer (d. 1880)
date unknown - Evan James, lyricist of the Welsh national anthem

Deaths
1800
14 March - Daines Barrington, antiquary and naturalist (b. 1727)
May - Evan Hughes (Hughes Fawr), clergyman and author
1802
28 November - Robert Roberts, preacher (b. 1762)
30 November - Thomas Williams of Llanidan (b. 1737)
31 December - Francis Lewis, signatory of the Declaration of American Independence (b. 1713)
date unknown - Joseph Hoare, academic (b. 1709)
1804
20 September - Josiah Rees, Unitarian minister (b. 1744)
7 December - Morgan John Rhys, Baptist minister (b. 1760)
1805
August - Ann Griffiths, poet and hymn-writer (b. 1776)
1807
18 July - Thomas Jones, mathematician (b. 1756)
1808
21 January - Richard Pennant, 1st Baron Penrhyn (b. 1737)
1809
April - Charles Francis Greville, founder of Milford Haven (b. 1749)
28 October - Hugh Pugh, Independent minister (b. 1779)
28 November - Robert Roberts, preacher (b. 1762)